Martin Zbončák (born 21 July 1975) is a Czech football coach and a former player. He is the manager of FK Fotbal Třinec.

Club career
Zbončák previously had spells in the Russian Premier League with FC Dynamo Moscow and in the Greek Super League with Iraklis Thessaloniki F.C.

References

External links

1975 births
Sportspeople from Třinec
Living people
Czech footballers
Czech Republic under-21 international footballers
Czech expatriate footballers
FC Zbrojovka Brno players
FC Slovan Liberec players
AC Sparta Prague players
FC Dynamo Moscow players
SK Slavia Prague players
FK Baník Most players
Iraklis Thessaloniki F.C. players
FC Hradec Králové players
Czech First League players
Russian Premier League players
Super League Greece players
Expatriate footballers in Russia
Expatriate footballers in Greece
Association football defenders
Czech football managers
FK Fotbal Třinec managers
FK Bohemians Prague (Střížkov) players
FK Fotbal Třinec players
Czech National Football League managers